Siti Latifah Herawati Diah (3 April 1917 – 30 September 2016) was an Indonesian journalist.

Herawati Diah graduated from Barnard College in 1941, the first Indonesian woman to graduate from a university in the United States. In 1955, she and her husband B.M. Diah founded The Indonesian Observer.

Diah died in September 2016 at the age of 99.

Family
She had three children; two daughters and one son.

References

Bibliography
 An Endless Journey: Reflections of an Indonesian Journalist. PT Equinox Publishing, 2005. 

1917 births
2016 deaths
Barnard College alumni
Indonesian journalists
Indonesian Observer people
People from Belitung Regency
Indonesian women writers
Indonesian expatriates in the United States